Lygistorrhina is a genus of long-beaked fungus gnats in the family Lygistorrhinidae. There are at least 20 described species in Lygistorrhina.

Species
These 13 species belong to the genus Lygistorrhina:

 Lygistorrhina carayoni Matile, 1986 c g
 Lygistorrhina chaoi Papp, 2002 c g
 Lygistorrhina cinciticornis Edwards, 1926 c g
 Lygistorrhina edwardsina Grimaldi & Blagoderov, 2001 c g
 Lygistorrhina fijiensis Evenhuis, 2008 c g
 Lygistorrhina hamoni Matile, 1996 c g
 Lygistorrhina insignis Skuse, 1890 c g
 Lygistorrhina legrandi Matile, 1990 c g
 Lygistorrhina magna Matile, 1990 c g
 Lygistorrhina nassreddineri Matile, 1979 c g
 Lygistorrhina pentafida Papp, 2005 c g
 Lygistorrhina pictipennis Okada, 1937 c g
 Lygistorrhina sanctaecatharinae Thompson, 1975 i c g b

Data sources: i = ITIS, c = Catalogue of Life, g = GBIF, b = Bugguide.net

References

Further reading

 

Articles created by Qbugbot
Sciaroidea genera
Taxa named by Frederick A. Askew Skuse